Héctor Núñez Bello (8 May 1936 – 19 December 2011) was a Uruguayan footballer and manager. He was manager of the Uruguay squad that won Copa América 1995.

Playing career
Núñez was born in Montevideo and started his playing career at the age of 19 playing for Nacional. His good form earned him a chance to play for Uruguay, he was part of the squad for the 1959 Copa América.

He moved to Spain to join Valencia, he won the Fairs Cup in two consecutive seasons with the club. Later in his career he played for Mallorca and Levante.

Núñez died in Spain, aged 75.

Managerial career
Núñez worked as the manager of a considerable number of clubs in Spain, he has also managed in Mexican and Uruguayan club football. He was manager of the Costa Rica national team in 1992 and the Uruguay national team between 1994 and 1997 where he led them to the Copa América 1995 championship.

Honours

Player
Nacional
 Uruguayan Primera División: 1955, 1956, 1957

Valencia
 Inter-Cities Fairs Cup: 1961–62, 1962–63

Manager
Nacional
 Copa Interamericana: 1988
 Recopa Sudamericana: 1989

Uruguay
 Copa América: 1995

References

External links
 Valencia statistics 
 

1936 births
2011 deaths
Footballers from Montevideo
Uruguayan footballers
Uruguay international footballers
Association football forwards
Uruguayan Primera División players
Club Nacional de Football players
La Liga players
Valencia CF players
RCD Mallorca players
Levante UD footballers
Uruguayan football managers
Uruguayan expatriate football managers
La Liga managers
CD Puertollano managers
CD Tenerife managers
Levante UD managers
Rayo Vallecano managers
Real Valladolid managers
Granada CF managers
Atlético Madrid managers
UD Las Palmas managers
Club Nacional de Football managers
Tecos F.C. managers
Costa Rica national football team managers
Uruguay national football team managers
1995 Copa América managers
Expatriate footballers in Spain
Al Nassr FC managers
Tacuarembó F.C. managers
Expatriate football managers in Spain
Expatriate football managers in Costa Rica